Macaria transitaria, the blurry chocolate angle, is a moth of the  family Geometridae. It is found in North America.

The wingspan is 23–26 mm.

The larva feeds on Pinus species.

External links
Bugguide

Macariini
Moths described in 1861